The Clans Will Rise Again is Grave Digger's 15th album under their new label Napalm Records. It is a "loose sequel" to their Tunes of War album. It was released on 1 October 2010. It is also the first album to feature guitarist Axel Ritt.

Track listing

Personnel 
 Chris Boltendahl - lead and backing vocals
 Axel Ritt - guitars and backing vocals
 Jens Becker - bass
 Stefan Arnold - drums
 H.P. Katzenburg - keyboards

Charts

References

2010 albums
Grave Digger (band) albums
Napalm Records albums